2150 may refer to:

AD 2150, a year in the 22nd century
2150 BC, a year in the 22nd century BC
Daleks' Invasion Earth 2150 A.D., a 1966 British science fiction film
Earth 2150, a 2000 real-time strategy video game